The Azerbaijan national badminton team represents Azerbaijan in international badminton team competitions. The national team was formed in 1964 after badminton was introduced in Azerbaijan by the Soviets and after the formation of the Azerbaijan Republic Badminton Federation. 

The Azerbaijani men's and women's team debuted in the European Men's and Women's Team Badminton Championships in 2018. Both teams later participated in the next edition.

Azerbaijan made its Olympic badminton debut at the 2020 Summer Olympics when player Ade Resky Dwicahyo would represent the country in the men's singles event.

Participation in European Team Badminton Championships

Men's Team

Players 

Men
Ade Resky Dwicahyo
Azmy Qowimuramadhoni
Jahid Alhasanov
Orkhan Galandarov
Sabuhi Huseynov
Kanan Rzayev

Women
Era Maftuha
Nigar Aliyeva
Narmin Sharifova
Zulfiyya Huseynova

References

Badminton
National badminton teams
Badminton in Azerbaijan